Viggo Biehl Jensen (born 15 September  1947) is a Danish former football player and manager. He was most recently the manager of Danish Superliga side Silkeborg IF.

As a player, Jensen played for Danish sides B 1909, Esbjerg fB, and Odense Boldklub and the German sides FC Bayern Munich and SpVgg Fürth. He represented the Denmark national football team in 8 games from 1971 to 1973.

As a coach, he was named Danish manager of the Year in 1988. He managed the Denmark national under-21 football team from 1989 to 1992 and Malmö FF 1992–1994. In July 2007 he was announced new coach of Estonia a job he held until November 2007, when he was replaced by Tarmo Rüütli.

References

External links 
 Viggo Jensen at dbu.dk 
 
 Viggo Jensen Interview

1947 births
Living people
People from Esbjerg
Danish men's footballers
Association football defenders
Association football midfielders
Denmark international footballers
Esbjerg fB players
FC Bayern Munich footballers
SpVgg Greuther Fürth players
Odense Boldklub players
Bundesliga players
2. Bundesliga players
Danish football managers
Silkeborg IF managers
Malmö FF managers
Odense Boldklub managers
Viborg FF managers
Aarhus Fremad managers
Esbjerg fB managers
Estonia national football team managers
Vejle Boldklub managers
Danish expatriate football managers
Expatriate football managers in Sweden
Expatriate football managers in Estonia
Sportspeople from the Region of Southern Denmark